Clay Hill is a mountain located in the Catskill Mountains of New York east-northeast of Roxbury. Negro Hill is located west and Ferris Hill is located northwest of Clay Hill.

References

Mountains of Delaware County, New York
Mountains of New York (state)